Bassène Kansana is a settlement in Senegal. At the 2002 census the population was 40 inhabitants in 6 households.

References

External links
PEPAM

Populated places in the Bignona Department
Arrondissement of Sindian